Red Gap, also known as Saggart Hill or Slieve Thoul, is a hill 395 feet above sea level situated  16 kilometres southwest of Dublin city centre in the Dublin Mountains close to Saggart and Rathcoole. The hill gets its name from the townland of 'Redgap' which lies just to the north of it. Today, Red Gap is home to farmland and telecommunication masts. The hill has FM radio transmitters for Newstalk, Kfm, LMFM, i105-107 and East Coast FM.

The hill is also home to low-power fill in transmitters of Nova 100 and 4FM, designed to cover the Dublin commuter belt

The old-time song "Campbell's farewell to Red Gap" is believed to be referring to this hill.

Radio transmissions

See also
 List of mountains and hills of County Dublin

References 

Mountains and hills of South Dublin (county)